Turning Point were formed in 1976 fusion band from the UK. The band was formed by Jeff Clyne (bass) and Brian Miller (keyboards), who had  played together in Isotope, Dave Tidball on saxes and Paul Robinson drums/percussion, and Pepi Lemer (wordless vocals). They recorded two albums: Creatures of the Night (1977) and Silent Promise (1978), both on the Gull label.

References

British jazz ensembles